Samuel Plata Plata (born 9 November 1970) is a Bolivian auto mechanic and politician who served as a member of the Chamber of Deputies from La Paz, representing circumscription 22 from 2010 to 2015. Born in a peasant community in the Altiplano plateau, Plata scaled the ranks of traditional leadership, serving as president of the Chuncarcota school board, mallku of his Aymara township, and finally, jach'a mallku cantonal of the three ayllus in the Urinsaya Marka, the sector's highest indigenous authority. Plata's prominent local presence led regional peasant sectors to nominate him as their representative in the Legislative Assembly, with the Movement for Socialism sponsoring his successful candidacy for a seat in the Chamber of Deputies.

Early life and career 
Samuel Plata was born on 9 November 1970, one of ten children born to Daniel Plata and Manuela Plata, a peasant family native to Chuncarcota de Machaca, situated on western La Paz's Altiplano plateau. Together with his siblings, Plata was raised practicing subsistence farming, even as he simultaneously attended the local primary school, where he excelled as a student. As his own school only ran up to fifth grade, Plata continued his studies one town over in Conchacollo de Machaca and later in the municipal capital, San Andrés de Machaca, a two-and-a-half hour bike trek he made daily.

As a teenager, Plata moved to El Alto, where he studied to become an auto mechanic. He practiced that profession at various workshops in the city and did maintenance on heavy machinery for private companies. During this time, Plata became active in local community leadership, participating in events and meetings convened by the Villa Exaltación neighborhood council. By age 17, Plata had risen to become the organization's secretary of relations.

Even as Plata's presence in El Alto grew, he maintained links to his indigenous community, collaborating with social organizations to organize sporting events and other activities for the town. Over time, Plata's visits became more frequent, and by 2003, he had re-settled in Chuncarcota, where he was elected president of the town's school board. The following year, Plata was named mallku, an indigenous authority charged with leading and representing the community before the municipal government and other institutions. By 2005, Plata had risen to become jach'a mallku cantonal, the highest indigenous authority of the sector, representing the three ayllus that make up the Urinsaya Marka.

Chamber of Deputies

Election 

In the leadup to the 2009 general election, Plata was put forward by his community to run for the region's seat in the Chamber of Deputies. He faced nine other pre-candidates for the nomination, each representing their respective municipalities. After a public event in the Taraco Municipality where each contestant presented their proposals and initiatives, Plata was finally selected from among the contenders to represent the Ingavi Province on the ballot. He registered his candidacy with the Movement for Socialism, with whom he won the election by an overwhelming margin.

Tenure 
Once in the Legislative Assembly, Plata was selected to chair La Paz's departmental caucus in his first year. He served in different committees within the Government, Defense, and Armed Forces Commission for two non-consecutive years and was a member of the Constitutional Development and Legislation Committee for three, chairing said body as its secretary in his final two years in office. Upon the conclusion of his term, Plata was not nominated for reelection and was unable to contest local office due to a controversial ruling by the Supreme Electoral Tribunal stating that outgoing legislators did not meet residency requirements because their primary residence had been La Paz for the past two years. Plata was among the many legislators who protested the decision, presenting in his final days in office a bill to suspend electoral authorities who "put at risk" the rights of Bolivian citizens to participate in politics.

Commission assignments 
 Constitution, Legislation, and Electoral System Commission
 Constitutional Development and Legislation Committee (2011–2012; Secretary: 2013–2015)
 Government, Defense, and Armed Forces Commission
 Defense, Armed Forces, Borders, and Civil Defense Committee (2012–2013)
 Public Security Committee (2010–2011)

Electoral history

References

Notes

Footnotes

Bibliography

External links 
 Deputies profile Vice Presidency .

1970 births
Living people
21st-century Bolivian politicians
Aymara politicians
Bolivian people of Aymara descent
Bolivian politicians of indigenous peoples descent
Bolivian trade unionists
Members of the Bolivian Chamber of Deputies from La Paz
Movement for Socialism (Bolivia) politicians
People from Ingavi Province
Mechanics (people)